Vesi Rarawa (born 4 October 1985 in Fiji) is a Fijian rugby union footballer.  He plays prop for the Fiji Barbarians and his club, the Duavata Rugby Club. In May 2010, Vesi was selected to the national Fiji side to play against Australia after military-affiliated players were subjected to visa bans in the wake of the 2006 Fijian coup d'état.

In 2010 he was selected for the Fiji Barbarians.

References

External links
 Oceania Rugby Profile

1985 births
Living people
Rugby union props
Fijian rugby union players
I-Taukei Fijian people
Fiji international rugby union players
Fijian Drua players